Morton Morton House, also known as the Morton Mortonson House and Morton and Lydia Morton House, is a historic home located at Norwood, Delaware County, Pennsylvania at the confluence of the Muckinipattis Creek and Darby Creek. It was built about 1750, and consists of a 2-story, symmetrical brick house with a gable roof and a -story wing with a gambrel roof.  The interior has a Georgian hall-parlor plan.  The building was restored in 1971, and is open as a historic house operated by the Norwood Historical Society.

It was added to the National Register of Historic Places in 2000.

References

External links
Norwood Historical Society website

Historic house museums in Pennsylvania
Houses on the National Register of Historic Places in Pennsylvania
Historic American Buildings Survey in Pennsylvania
Colonial architecture in Pennsylvania
Georgian architecture in Pennsylvania
Houses completed in 1750
Houses in Delaware County, Pennsylvania
Museums in Delaware County, Pennsylvania
National Register of Historic Places in Delaware County, Pennsylvania